Ecdysteroids are arthropod steroid hormones that are mainly responsible for molting, development and, to a lesser extent, reproduction; examples of ecdysteroids include ecdysone, ecdysterone, turkesterone and 2-deoxyecdysone. These compounds are synthesized in arthropods from dietary cholesterol upon metabolism by the Halloween family of cytochrome P450s. Phytoecdysteroids also appear in many plants mostly as a protection agents (toxins or antifeedants) against herbivore insects.

Ecdysterone has been tested on mammals due to the interest in its potential hypertrophic effect. It has been found to increase hypertrophy in rats at a similar level to some anabolic androgenic steroids and SARM S 1. This is proposed to be through increase of Calcium leading to activation of Akt and protein synthesis in skeletal muscles.

See also 
 Ecdysone receptor

External links 
 Ecdybase, The Ecdysone Handbook - a free online ecdysteroids database

References 

Steroids
Insect hormones